The 1953 USC Trojans football team represented the University of Southern California (USC) in the 1953 college football season. In their third year under head coach Jess Hill, the Trojans compiled a 6–3–1 record (4–2–1 against conference opponents), finished in third place in the Pacific Coast Conference, and outscored their opponents by a combined total of 199 to 161. The team's home attendance of 413,617 in six games was the highest in the country during the 1953 season. The total attendance of 561,389 in 10 games was the second highest in the nation.

George Bozanic led the team in passing yardage with 15 of 34 passes completed for 278 yards, four touchdowns and one interception. Aramis Dandoy led the team in rushing with 113 carries for 578 yards and six touchdowns. Tom Nickoloff was the leading receiver with 16 catches for 214 yards and two touchdowns.

Three Trojans received honors from the Associated Press (AP), the United Press (UP), or Tide Water (TW) on the 1953 All-Pacific Coast Conference football team: back Aramis Dandoy (AP-1); tackle Mario Da Re (TW); and guard George Timberlake (AP-1; UP-1; TW).

Schedule

Players
The following players were members of the 1953 USC football team.
 Mickey Artenian, left guard, #63, Los Angeles, 6'0", 190 pounds
 Al Baldock, left end, #83, Santa Monica, California, 6'3", 200 pounds
 Al Barry, 6'2", 221 pounds, right tackle (offense and defense), #79, 200 pounds
 George Bozanic, blocking back, #38, Lander, Wyoming, 6'2", 205 pounds (co-captain)
 Bob Buckley, wingback, #33, Brooklyn, New York, 5'9-1/2", 180 pounds
 Leon Clarke, right end, #81, Los Angeles, Commerce, California, 6'4", 210 pounds
 Jim Contratto, quarterback, #12, Compton, California, 5'9", 180 pounds
 Lindon Crow, wingback, #36, Corcoran, California, 6'1", 190 pounds ("a stand out on defense")
 Aramis Dandoy, tailback, #27, Torrance, California, 5'11", 180 pounds
 Mario Da Re, left tackle, #74, Crockett, California, 6'2-1/2", 215 pounds
 Jim "Triple" Decker, tailback, #21, San Pedro, California, 5'10", 190 pounds
 Landon Exley, quarterback, #35, Santa Monica, California, 6'0", 180 pounds
 Orlando Ferrante, right guard, #61, Los Angeles, 5'11", 192 pounds
 Ed Fouch, tackle, #49, Santa Ana, California, 6'3", 225 pounds (benched by a knee injury)
 George Galli, left guard, #60, Pittsburgh, Pennsylvania, 5'10-1/2", 195 pounds
 Harold Han, fullback, #46, Honolulu, Hawaii, 5'9", 185 pounds
 Addison Hawthorne, fullback, #23, Los Angeles, 5'10", 195 pounds
 Des Koch, tailback, #43, Shelton, Washington, 6'1", 208 pounds (led the nation in punts)
 John Miller, right tackle, #79, Compton, California, 6'1-1/2", 191 pounds
 Ron Miller, left end, #88, Los Angeles, 6'4", 205 pounds
 Tom Nickoloff, right end, #80, Los Angeles, 6'3-1/2", 220 pounds (co-captain, "a standout both on offense and defense" for three years)
 Frank Pavich, left tackle, #75, San Francisco, California, 6'0", 213 pounds
 Dick Petty, center, #54, Auburn, California, 6'0", 196 pounds
 Ed Pucci, left guard, #64, Canton, Ohio, 6'0", 215 pounds (invited to play in East-West game)
 Bill Riddle, blocking back, #52, El Centro, California, 6'0", 200 pounds (started season as 3rd-string quarterback, then moved to fullback)
 Vern Sampson, center, #53, Sacramento, California, 6'0", 205 pounds
 Leon Sellers, fullback, #44, Ontario, California, 6'0", 190 pounds
 Ken Thompson, right tackle, #78, Phoenix, Arizona, 6'2", 216 pounds
 George Timberlake, right guard, #56, Long Beach, California, 6'0", 210 pounds
 Sam Tsagalakis, aka "Sad Sam" and "The Toe", placekicker, #31, Los Angeles, 5'7-1/2", 165 pounds (kicked game-winning field goal against Stanford)
 Tom Weber, left tackle, #73, Canton, Ohio

Coaches and other staff
 Head coach: Jess Hill
 Assistant coaches: Mel Hein (line coach), George Ceithaml (backfield coach), Don Clark (line coach), Bill Fisk (end coach), Nick Pappas (backfield coach), Jess Mortensen (freshman coach)
 Senior manager: Bob Laughlin

References

USC
USC Trojans football seasons
USC Trojans football